"For All We Know" is a soft rock song written for the 1970 film Lovers and Other Strangers, with music by Fred Karlin and lyrics by Robb Wilson (Robb Royer) and Arthur James (Jimmy Griffin). Both Royer and Griffin were founding members of the soft rock group Bread. It was originally performed, for the film's soundtrack, by Larry Meredith. The best known version of the song is by American pop duo the Carpenters which reached No. 3 on the US Billboard Hot 100 chart and No. 1 on the US Billboard Easy Listening chart in 1971. The song was also a hit for Shirley Bassey at the same time in the United Kingdom. It has since been covered by various artists including Petula Clark.

The song became a gold record.  It won the Academy Award for Best Original Song in 1971.

The Carpenters version

Richard Carpenter of Carpenters heard the song during an evening of relaxation at the movies while on tour. He decided it would be ideal for the duo. It became a hit for them in 1971, reaching No. 3 on the Billboard Hot 100 singles chart and No. 1 for three weeks on the US easy listening chart.

When the original song was nominated for an Academy Award, the Carpenters were not allowed to perform it at the ceremony as they had not appeared in a film. At their request, the song was performed by British singer Petula Clark. (Clark would later perform the song in concert on February 6, 1983, in tribute to Karen Carpenter, who had died two days before.)

According to Richard, the intro was originally played on guitar. They had run into Jose Feliciano in a restaurant, who was a big fan of theirs and wanted to play on one of their records. They went into the studio and the intro was devised by Feliciano, using his nylon string acoustic guitar. The next day, though, Richard got a phone call from Feliciano's manager, demanding that he be removed from the recording. Richard essentially did as requested and replaced Feliciano's guitar intro with that of Earle Dumler's oboe. The other instruments heard on the song were recorded by session musicians later known as the Wrecking Crew.

In 1972, Richard and Karen appeared on Tom Jones's London Bridge Special, where they performed "For All We Know". This version was not released to the public until 2000, with the release of The Singles: 1969–1981.

Personnel
Karen Carpenter – lead and backing vocals
Richard Carpenter – backing vocals, piano, Hammond organ, Wurlitzer electric piano, orchestration
Joe Osborn – bass guitar
Hal Blaine – drums
Earle Dumler – oboe

Charts

Weekly charts

Year-end charts

Note
Released as a double A-side with "Superstar" in the UK

Shirley Bassey version
The song became a hit in the UK for Welsh singer Shirley Bassey in 1971, at the same time as the Carpenters' version, with the two songs competing for chart strength. Bassey's version peaked at No. 6 during a 24-week chart run. It also reached No. 20 in Ireland.

Petula Clark version
Petula Clark gave a heart-rending version of the song during her show at the Albert Hall on February 6 1983, in tribute to Karen Carpenter, who had died two days before.

Nicki French version

English singer Nicki French released a cover of "For All We Know" in 1995, which was included on her debut album, Secrets (1995). The song peaked at No. 31 in Scotland, No. 42 on the UK Singles Chart and No. 89 in Australia. A music video was also produced to promote the single.

Critical reception
Steve Baltin from Cash Box wrote, "French follows up her surprise dance hit cover of Bonnie Tyler’s "Total Eclipse Of The Heart" by giving the same treatment to the Carpenters’ "For All We Know". Sounding as if Donna Summer could’ve done it, "For All We Know" has a blatant disco feel. Look for this to be a club smash that crosses over to appeal to many of the same fans that made "Total Eclipse.." a smash."

Charts

See also
If I Were a Carpenter (1994)
List of number-one adult contemporary singles of 1971 (U.S.)

References

External links
 

1970 songs
1971 singles
1970s ballads
Songs with music by Fred Karlin
Songs written by Jimmy Griffin
Songs written by Robb Royer
A&M Records singles
The Carpenters songs
Shirley Bassey songs
Andy Williams songs
Johnny Mathis songs
Nicki French songs
Best Original Song Academy Award-winning songs
Songs written for films